Steven Smith (born 22 October 1962) is a British equestrian and Olympic medalist. He was born in Bingley, a son of Harvey Smith, and brother of Robert Smith. He competed in show jumping at the 1984 Summer Olympics in Los Angeles, and won a silver medal with the British team.

References

1962 births
Living people
British male equestrians
Olympic equestrians of Great Britain
Olympic bronze medallists for Great Britain
Equestrians at the 1984 Summer Olympics
Olympic medalists in equestrian
Medalists at the 1984 Summer Olympics
Olympic silver medallists for Great Britain